Chandra Free (born December 25, 1981) is an American illustrator and creator/writer of the comic book The God Machine, published by Archaia Entertainment and co-founder of publisher, Machina Corpse. Her work in comics includes Mice Templar, Graphic Canon vol 3 and vol 4 , Jim Henson's Fraggle Rock volume 2 for Archaia Entertainment, Sullengrey and the illustrated novel, Conspiracy of the Planet of the Apes. She has done non-comics work as well: storyboards for 321 Launch, cinematic storyboards for the movie The Monkey King, and character designs for an animated pilot HG Chicken and the Chronological Order for Project Meatball.

Personal life
Chandra Free was born in Orlando, Florida. Today she lives in Brooklyn, New York. She is an avid fan of The Venture Bros., Mystery Science Theater 3000, classic video games, independent comics, and goth subculture. She is also a LGBTQAI+ ally.

Comics

Creator owned 

 The God Machine (Volume #1: 2010) Archaia Entertainment

Artist
 Fraggle Rock Volume 2 Archaia Entertainment
John Carpenter's Tales For A Halloween Night (Volume 5) Storm King Productions
Odie (Issue #2) Small Scale Press
Modern Dread – A Horror Anthology of Modern Anxieties Space Between Entertainment
PSYCHOPOMP: BUNNY LOVE  GutterGlitter
Graphic Canon (Volume 3) "The Wasteland" Seven Stories Press
Graphic Canon (Volume 4) Seven Stories Press

Cover Artist
Halloween Man: Hallowtide #1  Sugar Skull Media
 Halloween Man: Hallowtide #2 Sugar Skull Medi

Colorist
Mice Templar (Volumes 4–5) (Alternate Covers) Image Comics
Sullengrey: Sacrifice #1 Ape Entertainment
 Sullengrey: Cemetery Things Ape Entertainment
 The Darkgoodby] Vol. 2(Cover) Tokyopop

Not Comics

Misc
 BLAM! Ventures LLC (Book Packager); Art Director 2010-2015
 SPACE:1999 Aftershock & Awe Archaia Entertainment; Continuity Director, Touch Up Artist
 The Monkey King Untitled Video Game (Illustrator) Global Star Productions

Storyboard Artist

321 Launch (Company); Storyboard Colorist
Monkey King

Illustration

 SYFY/DeviantArt: It's a Fan Thing Campaign
 Conspiracy of the Planet of the Apes Archaia Entertainment 
 Faye Wayward Raven Press
 Krampus Song by Miss FD  Music Video, Quantum Release Records - Illustrator (credited as SpookyChan Productions)

References

External links

 

1981 births
Living people
21st-century American novelists
American female comics artists
American comics writers
American graphic novelists
American women novelists
Female comics writers
21st-century American women writers